Barchana or Badchana, is a town and community development block in the Jajpur district of Odisha state in India. 

Barchana (Vidhan Sabha constituency) (Sl. No.: 50) is the Vidhan Sabha constituency.
This constituency covers the voters of the Barachana block. In 2019 Odisha Legislative Assembly election, Amar Prasad Satapathy was elected as the MLA.

References
 

 

Cities and towns in Jajpur district